Townsend's storm petrel (Hydrobates socorroensis) is a species of seabird in the family Hydrobatidae. It breeds in the summer on Guadalupe Island off the western coast of Mexico.  It ranges in the Eastern Pacific Ocean north to southern California in the United States and south to 10°N latitude. It used to be considered a subspecies of the Leach's storm petrel. It was formerly defined in the genus Oceanodroma before that genus was synonymized with Hydrobates.

References

 Ainley, D.G. 1980. Geographic variation in Leach's Storm-Petrel. Auk 97: 837–853.

Townsend's storm petrel
Birds of Mexico
Townsend's storm petrel